Ozyorny, formerly known as Bologoye-4, is a closed urban locality (an urban-type settlement) in Tver Oblast, Russia. Population:

History
The settlement was founded in the 1930s as a military unit serving Vypolzovo (air base) (the name of the airfield was taken from the nearby settlement of Vypolzovo). In the 1960s, the 7th Guards Rocket Division, operating strategic missiles, was relocated to the settlement and became the major employer. The settlement was known as Bologoye-4 since. In 1992 the urban-type settlement was renamed Ozyorny and officially was granted a status of a closed urban locality.

Administrative and municipal status
Within the framework of administrative divisions, it is incorporated as Ozyorny Okrug—an administrative unit with the status equal to that of the districts. As a municipal division, Ozyorny Okrug is incorporated as Ozyorny Urban Okrug.

References

Notes

Sources

Urban-type settlements in Tver Oblast
Closed cities

